KIC 9832227 is a contact binary star system in the constellation Cygnus, located about 1,843 light-years away. It is also identified as an eclipsing binary with an orbital period of almost 11 hours. In 2017, the system was predicted to result in a merger in 2022.2 (± 0.6 years), producing a luminous red nova (LRN) reaching an apparent magnitude of 2, or about the brightness of Polaris, the North Star. The LRN would remain visible to the naked eye for roughly a month.  The merger of the two stellar cores was predicted to give birth to a new, hotter, more massive main-sequence star. However, a reanalysis of the data in September 2018 revealed that the prediction had been based on a wrongly timed observation, negating the predicted merger.

The period of the variations in KIC 9832227 has been observed to be growing shorter since 2013, leading to the prediction of the merger in or around 2022. In September 2018, it was announced that the original prediction was based on a timing offset of 12 hours in one of the datasets. This shows that the period had actually been increasing up to about 2008. The cause for the period variation is still unknown, but it is unlikely that the system will end in a merger at the predicted time.

See also 
 Stellar collision

References

External links

Cygnus (constellation)
W Ursae Majoris variables
J19291594+4637198
Kepler Input Catalog